Tisiphone helena, the Helena brown or northern sword-grass brown, is a nymphalid butterfly. It is endemic to tropical northern Queensland.

The wingspan is about 60 mm.

The larvae feed on Gahnia species, including Gahnia sieberiana.

External links
Australian Caterpillars 
"Tisiphone Hübner, [1819]" at Markku Savela's Lepidoptera and Some Other Life Forms

Satyrini
Butterflies described in 1888